is a Japanese football player. He plays for FC Kariya.

Career
Hiroki Sasaki joined J3 League club Fujieda MYFC in 2016.

References

External links

1993 births
Living people
Toin University of Yokohama alumni
Association football people from Chiba Prefecture
Japanese footballers
J3 League players
Fujieda MYFC players
Association football midfielders